Limitless is the third studio album from Australian rock band Tonight Alive, released on 4 March 2016 through Sony Music Australia in Oceania and Japan, Fearless Records in North America and Easy Life Records in Europe.

Background
Production on the album began in March 2015 with producer David Bendeth. In April and May, the group supported All Time Low on their headlining US tour. On 3 July it was announced that they had finished recording, and that the album was expected for release later in the year.

Musical style
According to professional music reviews, Limitless is a departure from Tonight's Alive's previous pop punk sound, being described as pop rock by Blunt Magazine and Beat.com.au, as well as alternative rock by Pure Grain Audio.

Release
In late October, the group teased something that would be coming at the end of the month. On 29 October Limitless was announced for release in March 2016. In addition, a music video was released for "Human Interaction". On 11 December "Drive" was made available for streaming. On 11 January "How Does It Feel?" was made available for streaming. On 27 January a music video was released for "Drive".

In February, the group went on a European tour, followed by a UK tour with support from Our Last Night and Milk Teeth. Limitless was released on 4 March through Fearless Records. Following this, the group embarked on a co-headlining US tour with Set It Off, dubbed The Fight for Something Tour. They were supported by The Ready Set and SayWeCanFly. During the tour, the band performed at Self Help Fest. The band played two shows in Japan in April. In November and December, the group supported Sleeping with Sirens in the US, before supporting A Day to Remember in Australia.

Reception

The album has received mixed to positive reviews from critics. The band's maturing sound and Jenna McDougall's lyrics have been cited as the record's high points. In a very positive review, Jade Falconer for Musicology wrote, "With their last album being so dark, the more upbeat sound of Limitless could prove to show some positivity in the Tonight Alive camp. The growth and variety of sound they have shown on this album is a clear sign this band has so much more to give and their journey is truly just beginning."

Stephen Ackroyd also gave a more positive review of the album, saying "In breaking their mold - and that of everyone around them - Tonight Alive are being braver than their peers. While they could have moved with the pack and picked up the casual plaudits that come to any band growing their fanbase record by record, they've done what any artist should; been true to themselves."

In contrast, in a very critical review for Clash, Lisa Henderon called the album "an overly ambitious re-invention". Of the lyrics, she judged that the combination of McDougall's sorrowful lyrics and the erratic melodies results in a "distasteful musical theatre sound" and that "the blunder is only worsened by her bizarrely melodramatic vocals".

In a mixed review for DIY, Sarah Jamieson wrote, "When it comes to their latest musical offering, Tonight Alive are being fairly upfront with its sentiments." She also felt that while at times the band's ambitions pay off (in tracks "How Does It Feel?" and "Everywhere"), the album "at times feels a little overwrought, a little too cheesy, with some of Jenna McDougall's lyrics sounding less comfortable than you might expect." She concluded her review with "There's no doubting that Tonight Alive are being brave with their attempts on this new record, but they haven't quite hit the perfect balance between their past and future."

Track listing

Personnel
Tonight Alive
Jenna McDougall – lead vocals, keyboards
Whakaio Taahi – lead guitar
Jake Hardy – rhythm guitar
Cam Adler – bass
Matty Best – drums, percussion

Additional musicians
David Hodges – piano on "Human Interaction" and "How Does It Feel?"
Douglas Allen – keyboards, programming, effects, string arrangements
Steve Solomon – keyboards, programming
Brian Robbins – programming
Greg Johnson – effects
Koby Nelson – background vocals

Production
David Bendeth – production, mixing, arranger
Tonight Alive – arrangements
Jenna McDougall – art direction
Mitch Milan – digital editing, engineer, guitar technician
Koby Nelson – digital editing, engineer
Brian Robbins – digital editing, engineer, mixing engineer, spiritual advisor
Steve Sarkissian – drum technician
Ted Jensen – mastering
Thomas Russell – cover art
Mitch Storck – artwork, layout
Jordan Knight – photography
Matty Vogel – photography

Charts

References

2016 albums
Fearless Records albums
Tonight Alive albums
Albums produced by David Bendeth
Pop rock albums